In Ex Parte Estate Davies, an important case in South African succession law, the testator bequeathed £2000 in his will to a person who was not named in the will itself, but on a document which was in a sealed envelope given to his attorney. This document was not signed by witnesses.

The question before the court was thus whether this was a valid disposition. The court held that the disposition was invalid, because the testator did not comply with the statutory formalities regarding witnesses and signatures, as well as the fact that the identity of the beneficiary was not disclosed in the will.

See also 
 South African succession law

References 
 Ex Parte Estate Davies 1957 (3) SA 471 (N).
The Law of South Africa. 2nd Ed. LexisNexis. 2003. Volume 31. Paras 224, 240, 325 & 326.
The Law of South Africa. Volume 31. Butterworths. Durban and Pretoria. 1988. Paras 158 and 171. pp 103, 119 & 160.
H R Hahlo and Ellison Kahn.The Union of South Africa: The Development of Its Laws and Constitution. (The British Commonwealth,). Stevens & Sons. London. Juta & Company. South Africa. 1960. pp 629 & 637.
Dale Hutchinson (ed). Wille's Principles of South African Law. 8th Ed. Juta & Co Ltd. Cape Town, Wetton and Johannesberg. 1991. pp 364 & 369.
Kellaway. Principles of Legal Interpretation of Statutes, Contracts and Wills. Butterworths. Durban. 1995. pp 534, 593 & 594. 
H J Erasmus and W J de Waal. The South African Law of Succession. Butterworths. 1989. 
Heaton and Roos. Family and Succession Law in South Africa. 3rd Ed. Kluwer Law. 2019. Note 1256
Angela Beumker. Die Testamentsformen in Südafrika und ihre geschichtliche Entwicklung. Lit Verlag. Munster, Hamburg and London. 2000. p 93.
Marius J de Waal. "Testamentary Formalities in South Africa". Reid, de Waal and Zimmermann. Testamentary Formalities. (Comparative Succession Law, vol 1). Oxford University Press. 2011. p 386.
James T Faber, "Uncertainty About the Condonation of Formally Non-Compliant Wills, and the Rectification of Cross-Signed Mirror Wills" (2022) 25 Potchefstroomse Elektroniese Regstydskrif, p 2 
Speculum Juris 1965, p 40. 
(1957) 74 South African Law Journal 612
Kohlberg v Burnett NO and others 1986 (3) SA 12 (A) at 16

Notes 

Law of succession in South Africa
South African case law
1957 in South African law
1957 in case law